Longde Road is the interchange station on Lines 11 and 13 of the Shanghai Metro. The station opened on 31 December 2009 with the opening of line 11. It became an interchange station with line 13 on 28 December 2014.

Station Layout

References 

Railway stations in Shanghai
Shanghai Metro stations in Putuo District
Railway stations in China opened in 2009
Line 11, Shanghai Metro
Line 13, Shanghai Metro